Olympic Airways Flight 411 was a flight from Ellinikon International Airport bound for John F. Kennedy International Airport and operated by Olympic Airways using a Boeing 747-200 that on 9 August 1978 came close to crashing in downtown Athens. Despite maneuvers near the edge of the flight envelope, none of the 418 passengers and crew suffered serious injury. 

Boeing reported that there was an "engine shut down" while taking off.  

Based upon review of the flight data recorder, Boeing concluded that nine seconds after takeoff, the flight crew had turned off the water injection pumps in response to warnings, which reduced thrust. Turning off the pumps when the plane was in takeoff climb limited the plane's ability to climb. Boeing states that thrust was increased manually after 325 seconds and then the plane climbed normally.

Captain Sifis Migadis managed to keep the aircraft in the air at an extremely low altitude below minimal speed. All Boeing simulations of the flight resulted in crashes.

Flight details

Background
The Boeing 747 was the first "jumbo jet". It was a prestige aircraft in the 1970s and purchased by many airlines as a fleet flagship. Olympic Airways received its first 747 in 1973. Olympic Airways was the flag carrier for Greece and had purchased 747s for some of its prime routes, including a nonstop between Athens and New York. This meant that large numbers of American tourists could be accommodated in one flight at lower per-seat costs to the airlines. 

Athens lies in the center of four large mountains: Mount Aigaleo to the west, Mount Parnitha to the north, Mount Pentelicus to the northeast and Mount Hymettus to the east. The geographical area is called Athens Basin or the Attica Basin. The meteorology of Athens is deemed to be one of the most complex in the world because its mountains cause a temperature inversion phenomenon.

The captain of the flight was Sifis Migadis, who had 32 years of experience with Olympic. The first officer, Kostas Fikardos, was also considered experienced and was a close friend of Migadis'.

Accident aircraft

SX-OAA, named Olympic Zeus, was an Olympic Boeing 747-200. The 747-200 model featured more powerful engines and a higher maximum takeoff weight (MTOW) than the previous 747-100 model. One of the principal technologies that enabled an aircraft as large as the 747 to takeoff was the high-bypass turbofan engine. In the late 1960s, Pratt & Whitney developed a new such engine, and designated the JT9D to power the 747; with water injection, it delivered more thrust for the heavy jumbo jet.

On 9 August 1978, 418 passengers and crew were scheduled to take off from Athens at 2:00 pm on a direct flight to New York. The plane was heavy with the 160 tons of fuel required for the transatlantic flight.

Flight summary
According to Boeing, engines 3 and 4 idled lower than usual as the aircraft taxied. The plane initially took off and climbed normally. Boeing states that around nine seconds after engine shutdown, the water pump switch was turned off, when the flight crew misinterpreted the "water flow" warning as "water run-out". Speed decreased and altitude was lost. The Boeing report does not mention that engine number three exploded and other engines lost power, as was reported in the Greek newspapers. 

Migadis used his knowledge of aerodynamics to prevent the plane from stalling. He needed to fly level and avoid turning as much as possible. He also focused on getting the plane away from the city and to an unpopulated area, like Mount Aigaleo, to reduce the loss of lives if the plane crashed. While Migadis and Fikardos flew the plane, the engineer focused on the problems with the engines.

The plane climbed sluggishly to an altitude of just  as it approached the  Pani Hill in Alimos, after which the plane lost altitude. The plane flew just above apartment rooftops and took down some television antennas. The aircraft passed close to the Interamerican Tower. At some point, Migadis lowered the nose of the plane to gain speed and the engineer was able to increase the engines' power. When the speed reached , Migadis worked on increasing altitude and heading towards the sea.

At 2:05 pm, a light headwind gave the plane some altitude, which allowed Migadis to make a gradual turn to avoid crashing into the mountain. After flying over the sea to dump fuel, the aircraft returned to Ellinikon International Airport safely.

Conclusions
The Air Accident Investigation and Aviation Safety Board, the Greek national air safety board that investigates aviation accidents and incidents, was not established until 2004.  Brien S. Wygle, the vice president of Customer Support at Boeing, issued a report entitled Performance Analysis of the Olympic Airways Takeoff at Athens on August 9, 1978 with an Engine Failure at Rotation to Alex Fissher, Director of Flight Standards at the Greek Civilian Aviation Authority. Boeing concluded that,

Newspapers reported that engine three exploded during takeoff due to overheating of the turbine cooling pipes. The dangerous period of the flight lasted 93 seconds. Migadis managed to keep the aircraft in the air at an extremely low altitude and with below-minimum speed. All Boeing simulations of the flight resulted in crashes. Olympic Airways changed some of its procedures based upon the lessons learned from this flight. Boeing's training curriculum includes review of this case. Boeing is reported to have considered the aircraft unrepairable and a write-off.

Other factors
In the late 1960s, Pratt & Whitney developed the JT9D engine on an accelerated timetable, which resulted in engine flaws. In the 1970s, the JT9D engine had a number of mechanical issues and proper maintenance was required to ensure the engine's safety. For instance, high-pressure turbine core fan blades could become damaged and require replacement after 500 hours. The JT9 engines were also sensitive to tailwind airflow conditions at start. The early JT9D engines could flame out if the thrust levers were slammed forward. The jarring movement could put pressure on the engine and ultimately result in a flame out.
 
In 1971, American Airlines Flight 14 took off from San Francisco for New York. Sixteen seconds after the Boeing 747 took off, the Pratt & Whitney JT9D number 1 engine exploded after its turbine blades disintegrated. The National Transportation Safety Board said in its incident report that this was likely due to an ongoing pattern of the engine become overheated during starting procedures. The plane returned to the airport and landed safely.

See also
Olympic Airways Flight 830 (collision)
Olympic Aviation Flight 545 (crash)
El Al Flight 1862 (crash)

Notes

References

External links
 

Aviation accidents and incidents in 1978
1978 in Greece
Aviation accidents and incidents in Greece
Accidents and incidents involving the Boeing 747
August 1978 events in Europe
Airliner accidents and incidents involving uncontained engine failure